The Candymen (or the Candy Men) were an American pop quintet active 1965–1972 which prefigured the Atlanta Rhythm Section. The group were managed by Dothan, Alabama producer-songwriter Buddy Buie, and included guitarists John Rainey Adkins (who was the mainstay of the live band), plus Barry Bailey and J.R. Cobb, singer Rodney Justo, drummer Robert Nix and keyboard player Dean Daughtry. The band's chart singles included "Georgia Pines" (1967) and "Ways" (1968). They often performed as the backing band of Roy Orbison.

References

External links

American pop music groups